The 2015 Kentucky Secretary of State election was held on November 3, 2015 to elect the Secretary of State of Kentucky. Primary elections were held on May 19, 2015. Incumbent Democratic Secretary Alison Lundergan Grimes narrowly won re-election to a second term against Republican nominee Steve Knipper.

Democratic primary

Candidates

Nominee 
 Alison Lundergan Grimes, incumbent Secretary of State

Eliminated in primary 
 Charles Lovett, candidate for Jefferson County Justice of the Peace in 2010

Declined 
 Colmon Elridge, aide to Governor Steve Beshear and former Executive Vice President of Young Democrats of America
 David O'Neill, Fayette County Property Valuation Administrator

Results

Republican primary

Candidates

Nominee 
 Steve Knipper, former Erlanger city councilor

Withdrawn 
 Michael Pitzer, business consultant

Declined 
 Michael Adams, attorney and general counsel for the Republican Governors Association
 Matt Bevin, businessman and candidate for U.S. Senate in 2014 (ran for governor)
 Ken Fleming, former Louisville Metro Council member
 Damon Thayer, Majority Leader of the Kentucky Senate

General election

Endorsements

Polling

Results

References 

Secretary of State
Kentucky
Kentucky Secretary of State elections